Elementa harmonica is a treatise on the subject of musical scales by Aristoxenus, of which considerable amounts are extant.
The work dates to the second half of the 4th century BC. It is the oldest substantially surviving work written on the subject of music theory.

Title

The work is known variously as Aristoxenou (or Aristoxenoy) Armonika (or Harmonika) Stoicheia i.e. Aristoxenou Armonika Stoicheia, Aristoxenou Harmonika Stoicheia etc. All of these translate as The Harmonics of Aristoxenus. Elementa harmonica translates as Elements of Harmonics. The work is otherwise rendered as The Elements, or Elements, the latter translates into Greek as Στοιχεία.

Subject

Historical context
The Elements is held to be the work founding a tradition of the study of music based on practice, which is, to understand music by study to the ear. Musicology as a discipline achieved nascency with the systematic study undertaken in the work, which treated music independently of those prior studies which held it in a position of something purely and only in relation to an understanding of the kosmos. In-as-much, the Elements is the first and earliest work on music in the classical Greek tradition. Earliest considerations arose within the Pythagorean school c.500 and thinking dwelled on the mathematical nature of harmonia. Aristotle, whose Peripatetic school Aristoxenus belonged to, addressed the subject in his work On the Soul. Aristoxenus is thought contrary to the position of the Pythagoreans, he favoured an intellectual treatment of the subject which Aristotle had set out in his work,
which is the exercise of inductive logic with attention to empirical evidence.

Aristoxenus is thought the first to consider music in this respect, as a separate subject, due to this work.

Description
The work is a theoretical treatise concerned with harmony and harmonics, and thus pertains to a burgeoning theory of euphonics. The study of harmonics is especially concerned with treating melody in order to find its components (the Greek word for melody is μέλος).

In the first sentence of the treatise Aristoxenus identifies Harmony as belonging under the general scope of the study of the science of Melody. Aristoxenus considers notes to fall along a continuum available to auditory perception. Aristoxenus identified the three tetrachords in the treatise as diatonic, the chromatic, and the enharmonic.

The general considered attitude of Aristoxenus was to attempt an empirical study based therefore upon observation. In-as-much his writing contains criticisms of predecessing appreciations and attitudes, of the Pythagorean and harmonikoi, on the problems of sound percptable as music.

Editions
Translation into Latin for the first time, during 1564, was made by Antonius Gogavinus.

Editions were published by Meibom, Marquard (1868) Aristoxenou harmonikōn ta sōzomena: Die harmonischen fragmente des Aristoxenus, published in Greek and German translation, and Westphal. Henry Stewart Macran edition was published during 1902 by Clarendon Press, Oxford. An edition was published in Latin during 1954, and another in the same year in Italian, by Typis Publicae Officinae Polygraphicae.

History of scholarship

Pre-modern
Vitruvius (circa. mid-20s B.C.) based his understanding of the laws of harmony on the Elements of Aristoxenus.

The Elements was studied seriously and earnestly during the Renaissance, by theoreticians and musicians, because of the necessary choice which Renaissance intellectuals and thinkers had to make of deciding where to make concordance with, of the reality of the theory on music made by either Pythagoras or Aristoxenus. All the events belonging to the Renaissance Period as an approximate whole occurred within a time some time prior to and including the 15th and 16th centuries

Modern
Loloy made a study which was published during 1904. Annie Bélis composed a study Aristoxene de Tarante et Aristote: Le Traité d’harmonique, Études et commentaires 100, published during 1986.

Norman Cazden wrote the article Pythagoras and Aristoxenos Reconciled which was published 1958 by the Journal of Music Theory.

W.B.Stanford' The Sound of Greek (1967) cites the work.

Andrew Barker has made a translation, published in Greek Musical Writings (volume 1 published 1984, volume 2 1989).

Landels' Music in Ancient Greece and Rome (1999) deals with intervals in The Elements.

Kuntz (2000) thinks Aristoxenus to have provided a superior understanding to the Pythagorean treatment of the harmonic problem.

D Creese 2012 work concerns itself with Aristoxenus' consideration of the perfect fourth.

Synopsis
The work comprises 3 books. Book II seems not to follow from Book I, and it is quite widely but not unanimously assumed that Book I is a separate work from Book II & III.

The parts of harmonics:

(1) The Genera - the ways in which the differences between these are determined

(2) Distantia (Intervals) - the distinction of how these are differentiated

(3) Notes - dynameis

(4) Systēmata - enumerating and distinguishing the types, and explaining how they are put together out of Notes and Intervals

(5) Tonoi (Modes) - including the relations between them

(6) Modulation

(7) Construction / Composition

Discussion
The term dynamis seems to have been originated by Aristoxenus. Dynamis (dynameis) are conventionally understood to have, amongst other meanings, power and potentiality. Sidoli contends in his review (c.f. ref.) that the initial use of the concept by Aristoxenus was rather "elusive" in the context of the meaning intended by him.

See also
 Musical system of ancient Greece#Aristoxenian tonoi

References

Ancient Greek literature
Music theory